Anna "Annie" Arnott (née Mackenzie; 1887–1978) was a Scottish singer who sang in Scottish Gaelic in the puirt à beul style.

Biography 
Arnott was born and raised in Linicro, near Uig on the Isle of Skye in Scotland. She learned many songs from her mother who was descended from the MacDonald bards. She was regarded as one of the foremost exponents of traditional Gaelic song. Her singing was recorded in 1950 by Derick Thomson and later by Calum Maclean and by others from the School of Scottish Studies at the University of Edinburgh. Many of her recordings are archived on Tobar and Dualchais. The song Seallaibh Curaigh Eoghainn (Look at Ewen's Coracle) was included on a compilation of music from the Western Isles.

She was a housewife, crofter and also had a shop in Linicro. She lived in Glasgow for many years, eventually returning to Skye.

References 

1887 births
1978 deaths
People from the Isle of Skye
Scottish Gaelic singers
20th-century Scottish women singers